José Manuel Marín Gascón (born February 20, 1960, in Madrid) is a Spanish physician, professor and politician who is a directly elected Senator for the Vox party.

Marín Gascón holds a degree in medicine from the University of Murcia and worked as a sports physician. He has also taught physiotherapy at the Universidad Católica San Antonio de Murcia.

During the November 2019 Spanish general election he was directly elected as a Senator for Vox representing the Murcia constituency. In the Senate, he focuses on matters related to the constitution.

References

1960 births
Living people
Politicians from Madrid
Vox (political party) politicians
Members of the 14th Senate of Spain
Spanish physicians